Kurasovka is a rural locality (a selo) and the administrative center of Kurasovskoye Rural Settlement, Ivnyansky District, Belgorod Oblast, Russia. The population was 1,456 as of 2010. There are 15 streets.

Geography 
Kurasovka is located 7 km west of Ivnya (the district's administrative centre) by road. Voznesenovka is the nearest rural locality.

References 

Rural localities in Ivnyansky District
Oboyansky Uyezd